École secondaire de Mirabel (ESM) is a public Francophone secondary school in Mirabel, Quebec. It is a part of the Commission scolaire de la Rivière-du-Nord (CSRDN).

References

External links
 École secondaire de Mirabel 
 

Ecole
Schools in Laurentides
High schools in Quebec